The daggertooth (Anotopterus pharao, meaning "without fins on its back, of the Pharaoh") is a species of daggertooth.  Its distribution includes the North Atlantic Ocean and west of Africa.  The record size for this species is 96 cm and was hermaphroditic.
Daggertooths are occasionally found dead in bottom trawls used for firefly squid or shrimp.  They are similar to needlefish or gars.  However, they are distinct. Netted daggertooth specimens are rarely identifiable, mostly because of their soft bodies, which are easily torn or flattened.  This is typical of benthic animals of the deep ocean, like some transparent squids.  In fact, the bodies are so soft, when pushed against the back of a trawl net, they often die because their organs are crushed and they rip.  The habitat of the daggertooth is the open abyss, where few obstacles occur with which to come into physical contact.

References
 Anotopterus pharao at Fishbase
 Anotopterus pharao at the Ichthyoplankton Information System

Anotopteridae
Taxa named by Erich Zugmayer
Fish described in 1911